Gabriela Dabrowski and Alicja Rosolska were the defending champions, but Dabrowski chose not to participate this year. Rosolska played alongside Anastasia Rodionova, but lost in the first round to Petra Martić and Maria Sanchez.
Anabel Medina Garrigues and Arantxa Parra Santonja won the title, defeating Martić and Sanchez in the final, 4–6, 7–5, [10–7].

Seeds

Draw

References
 Main Draw

Monterrey Open - Doubles
2016 Doubles